Ioannis Karavitis (Greek: Ιωάννης Καραβίτης 1883–1949) was a Greek leader in the Macedonian Struggle from Crete.

Biography

Karavitis was born in the autumn of 1883 in Anopolis in the area of Sfakia in Crete. In 1903, while he was in Athens, he learned about Cretan forces going to Macedonia to fight and he decided to participate himself. After the Macedonian Struggle, he took part in armed conflicts in Crete and Samos, in the Balkan Wars and in the Epirote Struggle. He strongly disagreed with the outcome of the National Schism and the establishment of different states in Athens and Thessaloniki during the First World War.

Karavitis left Crete in 1929 and moved to Piraeus and later in Athens, where he rented the cafe "Argolis". A few years earlier, the Hellenic Military Academy had established a guerrilla warfare lesson called "Karavitis’ Tactics", which included a surprising approach of the enemy, gathering information, swift attack and retreat.

At the end of 1939 and beginning of 1940, Karavitis published in the "Kritikos Kosmos" (Greek: «Κρητικός Κόσμος») details of his struggles with plenty descriptions of the feats of Cretans. Later, he published what he remembered about the war in the newspaper "Ellinikos Vorras" (Greek: «Ελληνικός Βορράς») in Thessaloniki. The publication was launched on May 22, 1949, and ended on March 25, 1950, with a total of 236 sheets. In his memoirs more information about his participation in the Struggle were provided.

He died on 30 October 1949. The funeral was held at public expense, with the military funeral honours of a general at the First Cemetery of Athens.

References

1880s births
1949 deaths
People of the Macedonian Struggle
People from Sfakia
Military personnel from Crete